St. George's Church is a historic Episcopal Church on VA 178, northeast of the junction with VA 180 in Pungoteague, Accomack County, Virginia. Established in the seventeenth century, the building, erected in 1738, is the oldest house of worship standing on Virginia's Eastern Shore. The church was added to the National Register of Historic Places in 1970.

History
The Anglican (Episcopal) faith was brought to Virginia's Eastern Shore by English settlers migrating across the Chesapeake Bay from the Jamestown Settlement beginning in the 1620s. King Debedeavon had welcomed English traders and even settlers, and the English established a courthouse and Hungars Parish Church (1643) further down the coast in what became Eastville, Virginia. Chapels of ease (some of which later became parish churches when population warranted) were established near other settlements by the end of the seventeenth century. One near a Native American village that later became Pungoteague, became the predecessor to the present St. George's Church. Accomack Parish was created in 1663, and laid out in its present form in 1761. The first church to occupy the site, likely constructed of logs or frame, was standing by 1678.
In the mid-1730s, construction of a new church at Pungoteague began. The building, completed around 1738, was among the most elaborate in the Colony of Virginia. However, the Church of England (which reorganized after the Revolution as the Episcopal Church) was disestablished in Virginia early in the 19th century. Priests no longer could count on government support of their salaries, and soon the farms (glebes) which provided part of their salaries were privatized. Many fell into ruin, but some were repaired mid-century as the local economy improved. St. George's Church still preserves a silver communion service inscribed "This belongs to the Parish of Accomack" dated 1734-5.
During the American Civil War, the Union Army occupied the Eastern Shore (Delmarva Peninsula) from Hampton Roads northwards. Union troops protecting a strategic telephone line camped nearby, and housed their horses in the church's box pews, which were  heavily damaged. By the end of the Civil War, St. George's Church stood in ruin, one of its four wings completely dismantled and all interior furnishing destroyed. Episcopalians reclaimed the church in 1880 and partially restored it by using the remnants of the original walls to patch the transept which still stands today.

Architecture

Designed in Georgian style, St. George's Church was originally cruciform in shape with a communion table oriented to the east, box pews, an elevated pulpit, and a semi-circular apse (common in Georgian Churches in Maryland, but not in Virginia). The entire building was topped with a hipped, gambrel roof, also a unique feature among Virginia's Georgian churches. Though only a fragment remains today, the church's brickwork was especially well-executed using flemish bond accented by glazed headers. The only known image of the structure's original design is a sketch made by Reverend James Wallace Eastburn in 1819.

Modern times
The church is still active in the Episcopal Diocese of Southern Virginia. The Rev. Cameron Randle is rector of the churches of St. George's parish, which also includes nearby historic St. James Church in Accomac, Virginia.

References

External links
St. George's Church, State Route 178, Pungoteague, Accomack, VA: 1 photo at Historic American Buildings Survey

Episcopal churches in Virginia
Colonial Revival architecture in Virginia
Churches completed in 1738
Churches in Accomack County, Virginia
Churches on the National Register of Historic Places in Virginia
Historic American Buildings Survey in Virginia
National Register of Historic Places in Accomack County, Virginia
18th-century Episcopal church buildings
1738 establishments in Virginia